The Omni San Diego Hotel is a four-diamond high-rise luxury hotel and condominium tower in San Diego, California.  It is owned and operated by Omni Hotels & Resorts.

Hotel
Built in 2004 at a cost of $124 million, the 32-story, 511-room Omni San Diego is located across the street from the San Diego Convention Center and connected via sky bridge to Petco Park. The tower was developed by JMI Realty and designed by architectural firm Hornberger and Worstell. Other key contributors include general contractor Swinerton and Architectural Glass and Aluminum as the glazing contractor. There is also a sixth-floor outdoor terrace with a heated pool and jacuzzi, a McCormick & Schmick's seafood restaurant, and a full-service business center.

The Metropolitan
Occupying the top 11 floors of the Omni hotel tower (floors 22-32), the Metropolitan is a collection of 37 multimillion-dollar penthouse condominiums.

See also
List of tallest buildings in San Diego

References

External links 
Omni Hotels & Resorts
Omni San Diego Hotel

Skyscraper hotels in San Diego
Residential buildings completed in 2004
Hotels established in 2004
American companies established in 2004